The Curtain Rises is a 1938 French crime film directed by Marc Allégret and starring Louis Jouvet, Claude Dauphin and Odette Joyeux.

The film's sets were designed by the art directors Jacques Krauss and Alexandre Trauner. It was shot at the Epinay Studios in Paris and on location around the city.

Cast 
 Louis Jouvet as Le professeur Lambertin
 Claude Dauphin as François Polti
 Odette Joyeux as Coecilia
 Janine Darcey as Isabelle
 André Brunot as Monsieur Grenaison
 Madeleine Lambert as Élisabeth
 Roger Blin as Dominique
 Noël Roquevert as Pignolet
 Julien Carette as Lurette
 Marcel Dalio as le juge d'instruction
 Bernard Blier as Pescani
 Yves Brainville as Sylvestre
 André Roussin as Giflard
 Robert Pizani as Jérome

Bibliography
 Dudley Andrew. Mists of Regret: Culture and Sensibility in Classic French Film. Princeton University Press, 1995.

References

External links 

1938 films
French crime films
1938 crime films
1930s French-language films
Films directed by Marc Allégret
Films shot at Epinay Studios
French black-and-white films
1930s French films